Frank Wright (born 1898) was an English footballer who made one Football League appearance at outside-right for Southampton in 1920.

Football career
Wright was born in Birmingham and played for Hamstead Colliery where he was spotted by a scout from Southampton. He joined the "Saints" in October 1920 and after scoring regularly for the reserves, he made his first-team debut on 11 December 1920, when he replaced Joe Barratt in a Third Division match at Grimsby Town. The team was soundly beaten 3–0, and Wright returned to the reserves together with Charlie Brown and Alec Campbell.

His brief taste of first-team football appeared to have dented his confidence, for Wright only managed one further goal in 26 subsequent reserve-team matches before he was released in May 1921.

References

1898 births
Year of death missing
Footballers from Birmingham, West Midlands
English footballers
Southampton F.C. players
Association football forwards
English Football League players